2007 National League Two was a semi-professional rugby league football competition played in the United Kingdom, the third tier of the sport in the country. The winner of this league was promoted to National League 1. There is no relegation from this league as it is the lowest tier of professional rugby league in the UK.

National League Two

Table

Playoffs

 16 September (15:00): Oldham v Swinton
 16 September (15:00): Workington v York

See also

 Rugby League Championships

References

External links
 1 Championship 1

RFL League 1
Rugby Football League Championship
2007 in English rugby league
2007 in Welsh rugby league